The Parc d'entreprises de la Pointe-Saint-Charles, formerly known as the Montreal Technoparc and Adaport Victoria, is an industrial park and former industrial dump in the Pointe-Saint-Charles neighbourhood of Montreal, between the Champlain and Victoria bridges.

History
The site was formerly marshland adjacent to the St. Lawrence River.  It was used as a landfill and dumpsite from 1866 until 1966, and then was paved to serve as a parking lot for Expo 67 and was named Autoparc Victoria. Following the Expo, it briefly served as the site of the Victoria STOLport, or adaport in French.

References

Landfills in Canada
Environment of Canada
Redeveloped ports and waterfronts in Canada
Neighbourhoods in Montreal
Business parks of Canada
Le Sud-Ouest